The ZLM Tour is a cycling race held over five stages, held in the southern Netherlands and Belgium as a 2.Pro race on the UCI ProSeries. The race started in 1987 as an amateur race, and became a race for professional cyclists in 1996.

Name of the race
 1987–1989 : Rondom Schijndel
 1990–1997 : Teleflex Tour
 1998–2000 : Ster der Beloften
 2001–2010 :  Ster Elekrotoer
 2011–2017 : Ster ZLM Toer - GP Jan van Heeswijk
 2019–present: ZLM Tour

Winners

References

External links
  

 
UCI Europe Tour races
Cycle races in Belgium
Cycle races in the Netherlands
Recurring sporting events established in 1987
1987 establishments in the Netherlands
Cycling in Limburg (Netherlands)
Cycling in North Brabant
Cycling in Zeeland